Espurez (also Romanized as Espūrez; also known as Esbūrez, Esbūzar, and Ezbūroz) is a village in Miandorud-e Kuchak Rural District, in the Central District of Sari County, Mazandaran Province, Iran. At the 2006 census, its population was 606, in 170 families.

References 

Populated places in Sari County